Kaveh Akbar (کاوه اکبر) is an Iranian-American poet and scholar.

Early life and education
Akbar was born in Tehran, Iran, in 1989, and grew up across the United States including New Jersey, Pennsylvania, Wisconsin, and Indiana. He moved to the United States when he was only two years old. Before he moved to the U.S., his parents taught him how to talk by reading Muslim prayers. 

Akbar received his MFA from Butler University and his PhD in Creative Writing from Florida State University.

Works
Akbar is a faculty member at University of Iowa. He also teaches in the low residency fine art programs at Randolph College and Warren Wilson College. He is the author of Pilgrim Bell, a collection of poetry, published by Graywolf Press, Calling a Wolf a Wolf, published by Alice James Books in the US and Penguin Books in the UK, and the chapbook Portrait of the Alcoholic, published by Sibling Rivalry Press. American poet Patricia Smith says, “Kaveh Akbar has written one of the best books of poetry I've ever read,” after reading Portrait of the Alcoholic.In 2014, he founded the poetry interview website Divedapper. He uses the webiste to give other poets a space to share their stories and their writing. In 2020, he was named Poetry Editor of The Nation, a position previously held by Langston Hughes, Anne Sexton, and William Butler Yeats.

Akbar's poems have appeared in The New Yorker, The New York Times, Poetry Magazine, Best American Poetry, The New Republic, Paris Review, PBS NewsHour, Tin House, and elsewhere. Akbar founded the website Divedapper.com, where he interviewed major voices in contemporary American poetry. In 2018, NPR called Akbar "poetry's biggest cheerleader." With Ocean Vuong, he wrote poems for the 2018 film The Kindergarten Teacher, starring Maggie Gyllenhaal.

In 2019, The New Yorker published an online feature around Akbar's long poem "The Palace", and announced that his second full-length poetry collection, Pilgrim Bell, would be published in 2021 by Graywolf Press. In 2022, Penguin Classics will publish The Penguin Book of Spiritual Verse: 110 Poets on the Divine, edited by Kaveh Akbar.

Personal life 
Akbar is in recovery and writes openly about his struggles with addiction. In an interview with the Paris Review, he cites poetry as helping with his sobriety, saying, "Early in recovery, it was as if I’d wake up and ask, How do I not accidentally kill myself for the next hour? And poetry, more often than not, was the answer to that."

In 2018, he married the American poet Paige Lewis.

Awards and honors
 Pilgrim Bell a best book of the year NPR, Time, The Guardian
Winner of a 2017 and 2018 Pushcart Prize
 Levis Reading Prize
 John C. Zacharis First Book Award
 Ruth Lilly and Dorothy Sargent Rosenberg Poetry Fellowship
 Winner of a Lucille Medwick Memorial Award for a poem on a humanitarian theme

Selected poems
"The Palace", The New Yorker, April 2019
"Being in This World Makes Me Feel Like a Time Traveler", The New York Times, October 2017
"What Use is Knowing Anything if No One is Around", The New Yorker, June 2017
"Despite My Efforts Even My Prayers Have Turned into Threats", Poetry, November 2016
"Portrait of the Alcoholic Floating in Space with Severed Umbilicus", Poetry, October 2016
"Palmyra", PBS NewsHour, December 2015

Books

References

External links
 Personal Webpage
 Divedapper
 Kaveh Akbar: Profile and Poems at Poets.org

1989 births
Living people
21st-century American male writers
21st-century American poets
American male poets
Iranian expatriates in the United States
Iranian male poets
The New Yorker people
Poets from Florida
Poets from Indiana
Poets from Tehran